Stian Semb Aasmundsen (born 2 November 1989) is a Norwegian football midfielder who currently plays for Eik Tønsberg.

Career
He joined Mjøndalen from FK Tønsberg ahead of the 2013 season, and featured in their 2015 Tippeligaen campaign. Ahead of the 2016 season he went on to Swedish Allsvenskan club Jönköpings Södra IF. In December 2017 he returned to Norway, signing a two-year contract with Kristiansund. In March 2019, he returned to Mjøndalen. In January 2022, he joined Eik Tønsberg.

Career statistics

References

1989 births
Living people
Sportspeople from Tønsberg
Norwegian footballers
FK Tønsberg players
Mjøndalen IF players
Kristiansund BK players
Eik-Tønsberg players
Norwegian First Division players
Eliteserien players
Jönköpings Södra IF players
Allsvenskan players
Norwegian expatriate footballers
Expatriate footballers in Sweden
Norwegian expatriate sportspeople in Sweden
Association football midfielders